Arun Subhashchandra Yadav (born 15 January 1974) is an Indian politician and former member of 14th Lok Sabha and 15th Lok Sabha. He is a member of Indian National Congress party. On 13 January 2014, he was appointed President of Madhya Pradesh Congress Committee.

Early life and education
Arun Yadav is the elder son of Subhash Yadav and Damyanti Yadav. He finished his schooling from Daly College, Indore and graduated with Bachelor of Commerce from S.S. Subadh Jain Commerce College, Jaipur, Rajasthan.

Posts held

See also

List of members of the 15th Lok Sabha of India

References

External links 

Arun Subhashchandra Yadav on Twitter

India MPs 2004–2009
India MPs 2009–2014
Living people
1974 births
Lok Sabha members from Madhya Pradesh
People from Khargone district
Indian National Congress politicians
Indian National Congress politicians from Madhya Pradesh
The Daly College Alumni